The Hundreds is a streetwear brand founded in Los Angeles in 2003 by law school classmates Bobby Kim and Ben Shenassafar. The Hundreds also sells a print magazine, footwear and eyewear. In 2011 Complex magazine named The Hundreds as the fifth-greatest streetwear brand.

Stores
The collection is currently available in 400 accounts worldwide. In 2007, the brand expanded into retail, opening a store in Los Angeles. This Los Angeles store is located at 7909 Rosewood Ave, as the address appears on multiple items of clothing from the "Rosewood" collection. The Hundreds followed in 2008 opening San Francisco and in 2010 New York City. On April 1, 2011, The Hundreds opened their fourth retail store, located in Santa Monica, California.

Design
The early creation of The Hundreds designs were inspired by graphic designers from San Diego, Hawaii, and Hong Kong. The Hundreds has partnered with numerous brands.

References

External links
 

Companies based in California
Clothing brands of the United States
American companies established in 2003
Clothing companies established in 2003
Eyewear brands of the United States
Shoe brands
Street fashion